Cahit Irgat (21 March 1915 – 5 June 1971) was a Turkish actor. He appeared in more than one hundred films from 1940 to 1969.

Selected filmography

References

External links 

1915 births
1971 deaths
Turkish male film actors